High Ham is a village and civil parish in Somerset, England. Within the parish of High Ham are the villages of High Ham and Low Ham and the hamlets of Bowdens, Henley, Paradise and Picts Hill.

History

Within the parish of High Ham there have been two Roman villas discovered: Low Ham Roman Villa and another in High Ham.

The parish of High Ham was part of the Whitley Hundred.

Governance

The parish council has responsibility for local issues, including setting an annual precept (local rate) to cover the council's operating costs and producing annual accounts for public scrutiny. The parish council evaluates local planning applications and works with the local police, district council officers, and neighbourhood watch groups on matters of crime, security, and traffic. The parish council's role also includes initiating projects for the maintenance and repair of parish facilities, as well as consulting with the district council on the maintenance, repair, and improvement of highways, drainage, footpaths, public transport, and street cleaning. Conservation matters (including trees and listed buildings) and environmental issues are also the responsibility of the council.

The village falls within the Non-metropolitan district of South Somerset, which was formed on 1 April 1974 under the Local Government Act 1972, having previously been part of Langport Rural District. The district council is responsible for local planning and building control, local roads, council housing, environmental health, markets and fairs, refuse collection and recycling, cemeteries and crematoria, leisure services, parks, and tourism.

Somerset County Council is responsible for running the largest and most expensive local services such as education, social services, libraries, main roads, public transport, policing and fire services, trading standards, waste disposal and strategic planning.

It is also part of the Somerton and Frome county constituency represented in the House of Commons of the Parliament of the United Kingdom. It elects one Member of Parliament (MP) by the first past the post system of election.

Geography

Eastfield, Sedgemoor Hill is a grassland with orchids and butterflies which has been designated as a local nature reserve.

Landmarks

Stembridge Tower Mill is the only remaining thatched windmill in England and is under the care of the National Trust. Constructed in 1822 it was damaged by storms and left running via steam by 1897/8 and last used commercially in 1910. In 1969 Professor H. H. Bellot left the windmill, cottage and garden to the National Trust in his will. The mill has four floors, a thatched cap and is constructed of local limestone known as Blue Lias.

Education
High Ham Primary School is a voluntarily controlled Church of England school.

Religious sites

High Ham Church is dedicated to St Andrew. There is documentary evidence for a church in High Ham in 1168 although the current buildings are later in date. The tower dates from the early 14th century, the nave from 1476 and chancel from 1499. It has been designated by English Heritage as a Grade I listed building.

There is also a church without dedication, which was formerly private chapel to the manor. It stands on the site of an earlier church, and was started in the early 17th century, damaged in the English Civil War, and completed in 1690.

Notable people from High Ham
 Ned Sherrin, broadcaster, author and stage director

References

External links

Villages in South Somerset
Civil parishes in Somerset